Rotterdamse Schouwburg is a theatre in Rotterdam in The Netherlands.

The first theatre was constructed in 1773–1774. It was replaced by a second structure in stone in 1852. A third building was inaugurated in 1887. The third Rotterdamse Schouwburg was destroyed during the German bombing of Rotterdam in 1940.

The present building of the Rotterdamse Schouwburg was inaugurated in 1988.

References 

Buildings and structures in Rotterdam
Theatres in the Netherlands